Charles-Pierre Boullanger (1772-1813) was a French geographer who served on Nicolas Baudin’s scientific expedition to the South Seas from 1800 to 1803. He was a midshipman cartographer and hydrographic engineer on the survey vessel Le Géographe with the sister ship Naturaliste.  During this expedition he produced, with Charles-Alexandre Lesueur, a detailed map of the east coast of Australia.

Boullanger led a small group sent by Nicolas Baudin to Maria Island off the east Tasmanian coast on 19 February 1802.

Honours
Geographic features names in Boullanger's honour:

 Cape Boullanger — the north end of Maria Island.
 Cape Boullanger — the northern tip of Dorre Island in the present-day Shark Bay nature reserve off the coast of Western Australia.
 Cape Boullanger as the southernmost tip of Rottnest Island off Western Australia.
 Boullanger Island — off Jurien Bay, Western Australia.

See also
 Boullanger Island

References

1772 births
1813 deaths
Explorers of Australia
French explorers
19th-century French cartographers
18th-century cartographers